Égaules is a small hamlet annexed to Volvic in Puy-de-Dôme département, in Auvergne, France.

Villages in Auvergne-Rhône-Alpes